Ajstrup Parish is a parish in the Diocese of Aalborg in Aalborg Municipality, Denmark. The parish contains the town of Tylstrup and the villages of Ajstrup and Milbakken.

References 

Aalborg Municipality
Parishes of Denmark